Sanaʽa Institute for the Arabic Language (SIAL) is located in the Old City of Sanaa, Yemen, on Sa’ilah Street.  The school specializes in teaching Arabic as a foreign language.

SIAL also teaches courses in Arabic calligraphy, Islamic studies, and Yemeni culture.

The school, located in a house in the Tabariya neighborhood, attracted many students from the United States and Britain before the September 11 attacks in 2001, but today most of the students are from the Indian subcontinent and the far East.

The founder and director of SIAL is Muhammad Al-Anasi. He attended Reading University in the 1980s and was Arabic language program coordinator for the Peace Corps in Yemen.

Notable alumni
Umar Farouk Abdulmutallab, the "Underwear Bomber", a Nigerian who attempted to detonate plastic explosives hidden in his underwear while on board Northwest Airlines Flight 253, en route from Amsterdam to Detroit on Christmas Day 2009, enrolled in this school as a pretext to enter Yemen for terrorism purposes.
Saïd Kouachi, French gunman in the 2015 Charlie Hebdo shooting.

References

External links
Official website

Schools in Yemen
Arabic languages
Education in Yemen
Educational organizations based in Yemen
Educational institutions established in 1995
Sanaa
1995 establishments in Yemen